Gallicano is a comune (municipality) in the Province of Lucca in the Italian region Tuscany, located about  northwest of Florence and about  northwest of Lucca.

The municipality is located in Serchio Valley, on the right bank of the Serchio River.

Gallicano borders the following municipalities: Barga, Borgo a Mozzano, Castelnuovo di Garfagnana, Coreglia Antelminelli, Fabbriche di Vallico, Fosciandora, Molazzana, Fabbriche di Vergemoli.

Main sights 
 The Rocca (Castle) of Trassilico.
 Church of San Giovanni Battista
 Church of Sant'Andrea
 Church of San Jacopo Apostolo
 Church of Santa Lucia

References

External links 
 

Castles in Italy
Gallicano